The Football West State League Division 2 is a regional Australian semi-professional association football league comprising teams from Western Australia. The league sits at Level 3 on the Western Australian league system (Level 4 of the overall Australian league system). The competition is administered by Football West, the governing body of the sport in the state.

Format
The league operates with a promotion and relegation system. There is promotion to the Football West State League Division 1 for the top team each year, potential promotion to Division 1 for the second and third teams via a promotion/relegation playoff series, and potential relegation to the next lower league in the Amateur League Premier Division.

In 2020, promotion and relegation was suspended for the season, due to the impacts on the competition from the COVID-19 pandemic in Australia.

Clubs
The following 12 clubs competed in the 2023 WA State League 2 season:

References

External links
Football West Official website

Soccer in Western Australia
Fourth level football leagues in Asia